Saint-Pierre de Chaillot is a Roman Catholic parish church in the Chaillot neighborhood of the 16th arrondissement of Paris, at 31, avenue Marceau.

History
The parish of Saint-Pierre de Chaillot dates back to the 11th century. The historic church of the parish was entered from rue de Chaillot, with only a chapel with a brick facade opening onto avenue Marceau. That church hosted the funerals of Guy de Maupassant on 8 July 1893 and of Marcel Proust on 21 November 1922, but all that now survives of it is a statue of the Virgin Mary, the 'Vierge de Chaillot'. The present building (architect:Emile Bois) was completed in 1938.

Bibliography
Bertrand Lemoine and Lemoine Rivoirard, L'Architecture des années 30, Paris, éditions La Manufacture, 1987, 252 p.
André Deveche, L'église Saint-Pierre-de-Chaillot de Paris, Paris, édition Sides, coll. « Les églises de Paris », 1990

External links
 https://eglise-chaillot.com/

Roman Catholic churches in the 16th arrondissement of Paris